The following is a list of individuals associated with Berkeley High School (California) through attending as a student, or serving as a member of the faculty or staff.

Notable alumni

Activists
Bob Avakian, 1960, head of Revolutionary Communist Party
David Brower, 1928, president of Sierra Club; founder of Friends of the Earth
John Froines, 1957, Chicago Seven defendant, state track title team member, UCLA professor
Bobby Seale, 1954, co-founder of Black Panther Party

Actors

Raymond Burr, 1935, actor
Rafael Casal, actor, writer, producer
Justin Chu Cary, 2000, actor 
Chencho,2008
Robert Culp, 1947, actor
Daveed Diggs, 2000, actor, producer, rapper (Hamilton)
Richard Gant, 1961, television and film actor
Nina Hartley, 1977, adult film actress
Timothy Hutton, 1978, film and television actor
Eli Marienthal, 2004, actor
Paul Mooney, 1959, actor, comedian
Rebecca Romijn, 1990, model, actress
Andy Samberg, 1996, actor, former cast member of Saturday Night Live
Akiva Schaffer, 1996, comedy writer and director, Saturday Night Live writer and director
Jorma Taccone, comedy writer-actor, Saturday Night Live writer
Adivi Sesh, Tollywood actor

Artists and photographers
Michael Heizer, 1962, specializes in large-scale sculptures and earth art (or land art)
 Galen Rowell, 1958, wilderness photographer; did much work for the Sierra Club
 Bruce Ryan, 1971, production designer
 Ariel Schrag, 1998, cartoonist/graphic novelist

Athletes
Chidi Ahanotu, 1988, football defensive end for the Tampa Bay Buccaneers of the NFL
Shooty Babitt, 1977, Major League Baseball player, Oakland A's
Don Barksdale, 1941, All-American basketball player at UCLA; first African-American on US Olympic basketball team (1948); first African-American to play in NBA All-Star game (1953)
Rich Barry, Major League Baseball outfielder for Philadelphia Phillies
Brittany Boyd, 2011, basketball player
Glenn Burke (1970 Athlete of the Year), Major League Baseball player
Phil Chenier, basketball player for the Washington Bullets in the 1970s
Je'Rod Cherry, football player; won three Super Bowls with the New England Patriots
Bill Durkee, 1939, National Basketball League player for the Minneapolis Lakers
Jacob Grandison, 2016, College Basketball player for Holy Cross and Illinois
Chick Hafey, 1921, Major League Baseball player; won two World Series with St. Louis Cardinals; had first hit in All-Star Game history
Kamani Hill, 2004, soccer player; forward for Colorado Rapids
 Helen Jacobs (1908–1997), tennis player ranked world #1
Ruppert Jones (1973 Athlete of the Year), Major League Baseball player; 2-time All-Star
Jack LaLanne, 1935, fitness educator
John Lambert, basketball player at University of Southern California and in NBA
Billy Martin, 1946, Major League Baseball player; second baseman for five New York Yankees World Series teams in the 1950s, and manager of four playoff teams (Twins, Yankees, Detroit, A's), including one championship
Lawrence McGrew, 1975, football player, linebacker for New England Patriots, New York Giants 1980–1991
Walter Murray, gridiron football player
Hannibal Navies, 1995, football player
Steve Odom, football player, wide receiver for Green Bay Packers 1974–1977
Gene Ransom, basketball player for University of California, Berkeley
Claudell Washington, Major League Baseball outfielder

Authors, journalists, and poets
Shannon Wheeler, c. 1984, cartoonist, author of Too Much Coffee Man among others; published in The Onion, The New Yorker, and Mad Magazine.
Miguel Almaguer, c. 1995, correspondent, NBC News
Peter J. Aschenbrenner, 1963, author
Anastasia M. Ashman, 1982, author
Alexandra Berzon, 1997, Pulitzer Prize winning journalist for Wall Street Journal
Belva Davis, 1951, journalist
Philip K. Dick, 1947, author of Do Androids Dream of Electric Sheep?, on which the movie Blade Runner was based, and many other books
David Gordon, 1961, editor of Harvard Crimson, economist, syndicated columnist
Sandra Gulland, 1962, novelist
Shelley Jackson, author of Patchwork Girl
Ursula K. Le Guin, 1947, science fiction author of the Earthsea series, The Left Hand of Darkness, and many other books
Thomas Levenson, 1958, science writer, author of Newton and the Counterfeiter, Einstein in Berlin and other books
Leza Lowitz, 1980, author, poet, editor, journalist
Ariel Schrag, 1998, autobiographical graphic novelist
Joel Selvin, 1967, rock music critic and author
Frank Somerville, 1976, television news anchor, KTVU Oakland
Ricardo Sternberg, 1967, poet
Tess Taylor, 1995, poet and CNN contributor
Elizabeth Treadwell, 1985, poet
Gina Welch, 1997, novelist and TV writer
Charlotte Wilder, c. 1915, poet, sister of Thornton Wilder
Thornton Wilder, c. 1915, novelist and playwright
Mark London Williams, 1977, author
Catherine Yronwode, 1965, author, editor, publisher, graphic designer

Entrepreneurs
Jonathan Daniel, 1979, talent agent, representing major musical acts including Green Day, Jewel, Lorde...
Ben Horowitz, c. 1984, businessman, investor, blogger, and author
 Paul Budnitz, 1985, founder of Kidrobot and Ello

Filmmakers
Amir Bar-Lev, 1990, documentary director/producer
Gregory Hoblit, 1962, television and film director
Ian Inaba, 1989, music video/film director
Leah Meyerhoff, 1997, Student Academy Award-nominated filmmaker
Dave Meyers, 1990, music video/film director
Michael Ritchie, 1956, film director
Colin Tilley, 2006, music video/film director (including music videos for Chris Brown and Justin Bieber)

Mathematicians, scientists and inventors
Richard Bolt, 1928, physics professor at MIT with an interest in acoustics; created BBN ("modem" and "e-mail")
John Brillhart, 1948, mathematician, author of books on large-number factorization
Andrew Gleason (graduated elsewhere), mathematician
Albert Gjedde 1965, neuroscientist, co-inventor of Gjedde-Patlak plot; McGill University Montreal Canada, University of Copenhagen, Denmark
Sam Ruben, 1931?, co-discoverer of C14, a radioactive isotope of carbon, in 1940; the isotope led to many advances in the fields of biochemistry and medicine as well as its use in carbon dating for archeology
Pei-Yuan Wei, 1986, (魏培源, pinyin: Wèi Péiyuán), created ViolaWWW, one of the first graphical web browsers
Bill Woodcock, 1989, developed anycast DNS, and built more than 100 Internet exchange points around the world

Media
 Megan Greenwell, journalist and editor-in-chief of Deadspin and Wired.com
 Sam "Kobe" Hartman-Kenzler, 2004, esports commentator
 Dawn Monique Williams, 1996, theatre director

Musicians
Ambrose Akinmusire, 2000, jazz trumpet player
Peter Apfelbaum, 1978, multi-instrumentalist/composer of Hieroglyphics Ensemble
Steven Bernstein, 1979, jazz trumpeter, slide trumpeter, arranger/composer and bandleader
Will Bernard, 1977, guitarist
Stephen Bishop, 1958, classical pianist known as Stephen Bishop-Kovacevich and Stephen Kovacevich
Kevin Cadogan, 1988, rock guitarist, formerly of Third Eye Blind
The Cataracs, indie-pop duo
KSHMR, electronic musician, record producer
Aaron Cometbus, drummer in punk bands Crimpshrine and Pinhead Gunpowder, author of Cometbus fanzine
DJ Fuze, hip hop DJ and record producer
Gabriela Lena Frank, 1990, classical composer and pianist
G-Eazy, 2007, rapper, songwriter
Benny Green, 1980, jazz pianist
Charlie Hunter, 1985, jazz guitarist
David Immerglück, 1979, multi-instrumentalist/guitarist for Counting Crows, Camper Van Beethoven and the Monks of Doom
Joe and Eddie (Joe Gilbert and Eddie Brown), folk singers
Greg 'Curly' Keranen, 1973, bassist, The Rubinoos, Jonathan Richman and the Modern Lovers
Stephen "Doc" Kupka, 1964, founding member/baritone saxophone of Tower of Power
Phil Lesh, 1957, Grateful Dead bass player
Jesse Michaels, singer of the East Bay punk band Operation Ivy, Common Rider; son of writer Leonard Michaels
Johnny Otis (1921–2012), musician, record producer, disc jockey
The Pack, some members attended Berkeley High School
Lenny Pickett, Saturday Night Live saxophone player
Julian Waterfall Pollack, 2006, jazz pianist
Thomas Pridgen, drummer for The Mars Volta
Joshua Redman, 1986, jazz musician
Timex Social Club, contemporary R&B group
Geoff Tyson, guitarist and record producer
The Uptones, ska band
Kyle Vincent, contemporary pop recording artist/singer-songwriter, producer
Donald Weilerstein, 1958, classical violinist, founder of Cleveland String Quartet, faculty member at Juilliard School

Politicians
Audie Bock, 1963, California politician and film scholar
Shirley Dean, 1950, Berkeley City Council member 1975–1982 and 1986–1994, and mayor 1994–2002
Matthew Denn, 1984, Lieutenant Governor of Delaware 2009–2014, Attorney General of Delaware 2015—
Elihu Harris, 1965, Mayor of Oakland, California, 1991–99
George Livingston, first elected African American Mayor of Richmond 1985–1993
Aaron Peskin, 1982, former president, San Francisco Board of Supervisors
Nick Sinai, former Deputy Chief Technology Officer of the United States and gov-tech pioneer

Notable faculty
 Pumpsie Green, first black player for the Boston Red Sox; coached baseball at Berkeley High for many years
 Edgar Manske, member of the College Football Hall of Fame, former assistant football coach at Cal under Pappy Waldorf; taught biology at Berkeley High for 20 years (1955–1975)

Notes

External links

 
High schools in Alameda County, California
Berkeley High School (Berkeley, California) people

Berkeley, California-related lists
Berkeley High School (Berkeley, California) people